The Red Spear Society began as a rural self-defense movement in Henan, Hebei and Shandong in northern China during the Warlord Era in the 1920s. These were local groups of small-holders and tenant farmers organized to defend villages against roaming bandits, warlords, tax collectors or later Chinese communists or Japanese. For most of the Republic of China period in China the Red Spear Society posed a challenge to government control in North China. They were similar in nature to the Big Swords Society.

Because of a large immigration to Northeast China to escape the chaos in North China they were also active in Manchuria forming part of the Anti-Japanese volunteer armies resisting the Japanese establishment of Manchukuo in 1932.

In Manchuria members of the brotherhood were described as "primitive-minded people" who placed their faith in rustic magics and belief in the righteous character's Heavenly reward. Red Spear bodies formed in the countryside round Harbin were in many cases led by Buddhist monks as they went into battle, they and their weapons decorated with magic inscriptions similar to the earlier Boxer rebels. The color red was used as it was believed to offer them protection against disaster.

Some Society members were won over and absorbed by the Chinese Red Army during the Second Sino-Japanese War or by the People's Liberation Army in the Chinese Civil War. In 1953, the Chinese Communist Party government launched a suppression campaign against Hui-Dao-Men ("Societies-Ways-Brotherhoods"), eradicating them from the Chinese mainland. Some of their offshoots have reappeared, reintroduced by Chinese adherents who live overseas.

See also 
Pingdingshan massacre
Red Spears' uprising in Shandong (1928–1929)
Secret society
Warlord Rebellion in northeastern Shandong

References 
 Anthony Coogan; The Volunteer Armies of Northeast China, Magazine article; History Today, Vol. 43, July 1993.
 Elizabeth J. Perry; Rebels and Revolutionaries in North China, 1845-1945; Stanford University, 1980

External links
Notes On A Guerrilla Campaign

20th century in China
Second Sino-Japanese War
Chinese secret societies